Max Janowski (1912 Berlin – April 8, 1991 Hyde Park, Chicago), was a composer of Jewish liturgical music, a conductor, choir director, and voice teacher.

Born in Berlin into a musical family, Max was the son of Chayim Janowski, a choir director, and Miriam, an opera singer. As a youth, Max studied at the Klindworth-Scharwenka Conservatory (Klindworth-Scharwenka-Konservatorium) in Berlin. In 1933, he won a piano contest, which led to him becoming the head of the piano department at the Musashino Academia Musicae in Tokyo, Japan.  He emigrated to the United States in 1937 and served in the U.S. Navy during World War II.

Max Janowski's choral works include the traditional Jewish prayers "Avinu Malkeinu" ("Our Father, Our King," a hymn for the High Holy Days), "Sim Shalom" ("Song of Peace," which was dedicated to the American diplomat Ralph Bunche), "Yismehu," and "ve-Shomeru".

From 1938 until his death, Janowski was the music director at KAM Isaiah Israel Congregation in Hyde Park in Chicago.  On January 29, 2012, the centennial of his birth, a Gala Concert featuring several cantors, cantorial soloists, and area chorales was held at K.A.M. Isaiah Israel to celebrate Janowski's life and music.

Baritone Sherrill Milnes and mezzo-soprano Isola Jones studied with him.

References

External links 
 Janowski Gala Concert | KAM Isaiah Israel Retrieved January 31, 2012.
 Max Janowski, 79, Composer and Teacher, New York Times. Published: April 10, 1991.  Retrieved November 7, 2007.
 Edelman, Marsha Bryan, Synagogue Music in the Modern Era. Retrieved November 7, 2007.
 Max Janowski . Retrieved September 2, 2013.
 Max Janowski . Retrieved October 25, 2021.

Jewish composers
Jewish emigrants from Nazi Germany to the United States
German expatriates in Japan
Musicians from Berlin
1912 births
1991 deaths
20th-century composers